Hotel for Strangers is a 1967 Czechoslovak comedy film directed by Antonín Máša. It was entered into the 1967 Cannes Film Festival. The film reconstructs the last days of murdered young poet Petr Hudec (Petr Čepek), from the random entries of his journal, after he registers at the Hotel Svet.

Cast
 Petr Čepek as Petr Hudec
 Táňa Fischerová as Veronika
 Marta Krásová as Rosická
 Vladimír Šmeral as Blech
 Evald Schorm as Curate
 Jiří Hrzán as Kája
 Jiří Pleskot as Hotel trustee
 Jiřina Jirásková as Marie
 Ladislav Mrkvička as Vladimír
 Jiří Kodet as Jirí
 Jiří Menzel as Pot-boy
 Jan Libíček as Hynek
 Josef Somr as Receptionist
 Waldemar Matuška as Otomar
 Jan Kačer as Narrator (voice)
 Evelyna Juhanová as Ruzena

References

External links
 

1967 films
1967 comedy films
Czechoslovak comedy films
1960s Czech-language films
Czechoslovak black-and-white films
Films directed by Antonín Máša
1960s Czech films
Czech comedy films